William Bingham Baring, 2nd Baron Ashburton,  (June 1799 – 23 March 1864) was a British businessman and a Whig politician who later became a Tory.

Background and education
William Bingham Baring was born in Philadelphia, Pennsylvania, in June 1799, the eldest son of the politician and banker Alexander Baring, 1st Baron Ashburton (1773–1848), and his wife Ann Louisa (died 1848), daughter of William Bingham. He was educated at Oriel College, Oxford, where he graduated in classics in 1821. He received a Master of Arts in 1836 and an Honorary Doctorate of Civil Law in 1856.

Political career
Baring sat as Member of Parliament for Thetford between 1826 and 1830 and 1841 and 1848, for Callington between 1830 and 1831, for Winchester between 1832 and 1837 and for Staffordshire North between 1837 and 1841. He was elected as a Whig in 1832 and 1835, and from 1837 as a Tory. He served under Sir Robert Peel as Joint Secretary to the Board of Control from 1841 to 1845 and as Paymaster-General, with a seat in the Cabinet, from 1845 to 1846. In 1845 he was sworn of the Privy Council. In 1848 he succeeded his father in the barony and entered the House of Lords.

Baring was a member of the Canterbury Association from 27 May 1848. He was a commandeur of the Légion d'honneur, awarded for his services to commerce. He served as captain in the Hampshire Yeomanry Cavalry. In 1853, he was appointed to be a Deputy Lieutenant of the County of Southampton. In 1854 he was elected a Fellow of the Royal Society. One of his on-going legacies is the National Rifle Association's competition for the Ashburton Shield which was donated by Lord Ashburton in 1861.

Family
Lord Ashburton married as his first wife, Lady Harriet Mary Montagu, eldest daughter of George Montagu, 6th Earl of Sandwich, on 12 April 1823. Their only child, Alexander Montagu Baring (1828–1830), died as an infant. Lady Harriet is well known for inspiring the devotion of Thomas Carlyle, to the great dismay of his wife Jane Welsh Carlyle. Lady Harriet died on 4 May 1857, aged 51.

Lord Ashburton married as his second wife Louisa Caroline Stewart-Mackenzie, youngest daughter of James Alexander Stewart-Mackenzie, on 17 November 1858. They had one daughter, Mary Florence, (named after Florence Nightingale) born on 26 June 1860 at Bath House, Piccadilly, London (a site now occupied by the Qualifications and Curriculum Authority), who married William Compton, 5th Marquess of Northampton. Lord Ashburton died at The Grange, Hertfordshire, in March 1864, aged 64.

He was succeeded in the barony by his younger brother, Francis. Lady Ashburton subsequently had an intimate relationship with the sculptor Harriet Hosmer. Lady Ashburton died in London in February 1903, aged 75.

Eponymous
The Ashburton River in New Zealand and the town of the same name located on the river were named by the chief surveyor of the Canterbury Association, Joseph Thomas, after Lord Ashburton.

See also
Baring family
Baron Ashburton
Barings Bank

References

External links 
 

1799 births
1864 deaths
Alumni of Oriel College, Oxford
British people of American descent
British people of German descent
Commandeurs of the Légion d'honneur
Deputy Lieutenants of Hampshire
Members of the Privy Council of the United Kingdom
Members of the Parliament of the United Kingdom for English constituencies
Bingham Baring
Baring, Bingham
Baring, Bingham
Baring, Bingham
Baring, Bingham
Baring, Bingham
Baring, Bingham
Baring, Bingham
Ashburton, B2
Bingham
Hampshire Yeomanry officers
Fellows of the Royal Society
Members of the Canterbury Association
Presidents of the Royal Asiatic Society
Presidents of the Royal Geographical Society
Bingham
Eldest sons of British hereditary barons
People of the National Rifle Association
Committee members of the Society for the Diffusion of Useful Knowledge